The Derby dell'Enza, also referred to as the Derby del Parmigiano Reggiano, is the local derby contested by Emilian association football clubs Parma F.C. and A.C. Reggiana 1919. The name derives from the Enza river, which forms the boundary of the provinces of Parma and Reggio Emilia. The match is contested twice a year when the two clubs participate in the same league competition.

The rivalry stems from a historical rivalry between the cities of Parma and Reggio Emilia, which transcends sport. Despite the close rivalry, Parma are comfortably the more successful of the two sides, having won 8 major trophies. The first of these was as recent as the 1991–92 Coppa Italia triumph. Before the 1990s, neither side had played in Serie A, Italian football's top tier that was formed in 1929, so Parma's dominance is a recent trend. Fan violence between ultras groups is often a problem in this derby.

History

Separated by just 25 kilometres, Parma has historically been seen as a snobbish or aristocratic city, the capital of the small state Duchy of Parma and Piacenza, home to monuments, churches and palaces, and whose famous sons are musicians Giuseppe Verdi and Arturo Toscanini and painter Parmigianino, while the residents of Reggio Emilia were perceived as less affluent and hot-blooded with a strong background in agriculture, the first city to fly the Tricolore in 1797, but also excelled in the arts through the works of Ludovico Ariosto and Antonio da Correggio. The cities share the protected naming of the world-renowned Parmesan cheese, more properly called Parmigiano-Reggiano. Parma's football team was founded in 1913 and A.C. Reggiana 1919 was founded six years later in 1919. 1919 would also be the first year they met, as they duked it out in the Promozione and the Prima Categoria in what were both sides' first two seasons in league football from 1919 to 1921.

The two Emilian sides had six more meetings before 1930 was out, but neither side was able to win away from home. From 1932, the clubs had a since unmatched run of 8 consecutive seasons of league derbies in a period in which Reggiana had the upper hand, finishing above Parma in the league every year. This trend continued across the 1940s and 1950s, although derbies did not so occur so frequently over those years. For the 1952–53 Serie C campaign, Reggiana was given a 20-point deduction for misconduct denounced by the Parma management and was relegated to the ignominy of IV Serie that season. However, they returned as the 1960s neared with four seasons of Serie B contests in which the spoils were shared with three wins apiece out of eight, but Parma's relegation from that division in 1961–62 put an end to derbies until 1970.

On 18 November 1973, the derby was a goalless affair, but nonetheless notable for its on-pitch actions because of the match's three sendings-off. After coming to blows in the second half, both Sega (Parma) and Stefanello (Reggiana) were given their marching orders. Reggiana's Zandoli joined them after an off the ball incident to give the home side a man advantage. The 1973–74 Derby dell'Enza contents March 1974 also ended goalless, while the January 1976 match had the same lack of incisiveness, but ended one apiece. On the third last day of the 1974–75 Serie B season, the two sides met when they were threatened with relegation. A second half goal from Reggiana's Sileno Passalacqua was the only goal of the game and it ultimately sealed Parma's relegation fate. Reggiana would go on to avoid relegation via a spareggio against Alessandria in Milan.

In the 1989–90 Serie B season, both teams performed well, chasing promotion to Serie A. Fan trouble was caused by Parma fans in the Reggio Emilia game in late December, when they attempted to halt the train early in order to avoid police controls and also damaged locals' cars. In the match itself, Parma were superior, Maurizio Ganz scoring twice without reply. In the return match at the Tardini, Parma secured promotion to Serie A for the first time in its history. Nevio Scala's team again won the game 2–0 thanks to goals from Alessandro Melli and Marco Osio. The Parma fans' celebrations were in stark contrast to the behaviour of Reggiana's, of whom three were arrested, after cars were damaged, windows broken and Stazione di Parma was subjected to acts of vandalism. Parma had also secured a first league derby double in exactly 30 seasons, when Reggiana achieved the feat.

Serie A's first Derby dell'Enza took place on 24 October 1993, following Reggiana's summer promotion. Alessandro Melli scored the only goal of the game for a Parma team fatigued by mid-week exertions in Haifa. The return meeting on 6 March 1994 was bizarrely interrupted by a calf injury to referee Pierluigi Pairetto after just 20 minutes, meaning the match was called off at half-time and not completed until 5 April. In September 1996 at the Stadio Ennio Tardini, trouble was caused by the Ultras Ghetto, a Reggiana ultras group, as cars were vandalised and flares and firecrackers thrown into the Parma fan areas, despite a police presence of 500. The match itself was dominated by Parma, who emerged victors by three goals to two after Reggiana twice came from a goal behind to equalise before Gianfranco Zola netted the winner. In the clubs' most recent top division encounter in 1996–97 and first at the new Stadio Giglio (which had replaced the Stadio Mirabello in 1995), metal objects were thrown at Parma goalkeeper Gianluigi Buffon during the match. A gap had already opened between the fortunes of the club at a time when owner Calisto Tanzi owned Parma and sponsored Reggiana. The match finished goalless, but Parma would go on to finish in second position, which remains a club record, and Reggiana finished bottom, 18 points adrift of safety. This gap has only widened in the years since, as Reggiana have sunk two divisions below Parma.

Reggiana's good performance in the 2008–09 Lega Pro Prima Divisione, the third tier, while Parma were in Serie B, the second, raised the possibility of a 77th league derby in 2009–10, but this was extinguished when Parma won promotion back to Serie A at the first attempt and Reggiana failed to qualify from the play-offs. Because the match was not played for some years, some have called for its revival as a friendly, but the possibility was denied in the summer of 2010 due to worries about public order. Despite the relative inactivity of this derby in recent years, Reggiana has played no other side on more occasions in league football. On 19 December 2016 in Group B of the Lega Pro (soon to be renamed Serie C) and after nearly two decades without a competitive meeting, Parma won the derby with two goals at the Mapei Stadium. Parma were promoted at the end of that season and returned to Serie A a year later, being relegated in 2021, while Reggiana emerged from a bankruptcy event to climb back to Serie B, but dropped down from that level at the same time as Parma were relegated to it, postponing the resumption of the rivalry for a fifth season.

Statistics

Results

League
The listed results cover the clubs' league meetings.

Parma at home

Reggiana at home

|}

Cup

Coppa Italia
The two clubs have met just once in the Coppa Italia and Reggiana won the game 2–1, scoring the winning goal in extra time.

Coppa Italia Semiprofessionisti
Parma had the better of the two meetings in the Coppa Italia Semiprofessionisti. The sides met in Group 15 of the preliminary round.

Other competitions
Parma and Reggiana also played each other in the Coppa del Primato on 4 occasions:

Shared personnel

Players 
A number of players have played for both clubs over the course of their careers. This is an incomplete list of players who have made at least one appearance for both: 

  Armando Anastasio
  Luigi Apolloni
  Fabio Aselli
  Alessio Badari
  Mattia Bani
  Marco Ballotta
  Gianluca Berti
  Enzo Bertoli
  Alfonso Bertozzi
  Giovanni Bia
  Pietro Biagini
  Fabio Bonci
  Lamberto Boranga
  Massimo Brambilla
  Luca Bucci
  Ottorino Casanova
  Tarcisio Catanese
  Luca Cigarini
  Andrea Costa
  Giovanni Rasia Dal Polo
  Franco Deasti
  Alberto Di Chiara
  Pierluigi Di Già
  Costantino Fava
  Marco Ferrante
  Alessandro Fornasaris
  Augusto Gabriele
  Andrea Galassi
  Enzo Gambaro
  Luca Germoni
  Georges Grün
  Fabrizio Larini
  Mario Lemme
  Venuto Lombatti
  Marco Macina
  Roberto Magnani
  Giovanni Manfrinato
  Marco Marocchi
  Renato Martini
  Davide Matteini
  Giovanni Meregalli
  Adile Montanari
  Enrico Morello
  Enea Moruzzi
  Stefano Nava
  Olmes Neri
  Roberto Paci
  Roberto Parlanti
  Renato Piccoli
  Dimitri Pinti
  Fausto Pizzi
  Renzo Ragonesi
  Orazio Rancati
  Alberto Rizzati
  Stefano Rossini
  Francesco Ruopolo
  Luigi Sartor
  Luca Siligardi
  Davide Sinigaglia
  Silvio Smersy
  Livio Spaggiari
  Mattia Sprocati
  Pietro Strada
  Cláudio Taffarel
  Stefano Torrisi
  Antonio Junior Vacca
  Giorgio Visconti
  Carlo Volpi
  Davide Zannoni
  Otello Zironi
  Sergio Zuccheri

Head coaches
Only one coach has taken charge of both Derby dell'Enza outfits: Carlo Ancelotti. In 1995, he took his first job in management at Serie B side Reggiana, where he led the team to fourth position and promotion to Serie A. In the summer of 1996, he moved directly to fellow Serie A team Parma to replace the club's all-time most successful coach, Nevio Scala. Parma finished in second position in his first year in charge, which remains a record high league finish for the Ducali, and fifth position in his second and final season.

See also
 Parma F.C.
 A.C. Reggiana 1919
 List of association football club rivalries by country

References

External links
 La Storia della Reggiana

Parma Calcio 1913
A.C. Reggiana 1919
Sport in Emilia-Romagna
Enza